

Order of battle

Warships
IJN at time of Pearl Harbor Attack in December 1941:

Battleships
10 (plus 3 building) (1)
4 Kongō class — converted from battlecruisers. Built in 1913–1915.
Kongō — †November, 1944
Hiei — †November, 1942
Kirishima — †November, 1942
Haruna — †July, 1945
2 Fusō class — built 1915-1917
Fusō — †October, 1944
Yamashiro — †October, 1944
2 Ise class — built 1917-1918
 Ise — †July, 1945
 Hyūga — run aground in July, 1945
2 Nagato class — built 1920-1921
 Nagato
 Mutsu — †June, 1943
0 Yamato class (3 building (1 converted to aircraft carrier Shinano) and 1 cancelled later in 1941).
 Yamato — commissioned 1941, † 1945
 Musashi — commissioned 1942, † 1944
 The fourth of the class, Hull Number 111 was scrapped in 1942 when only 30% complete, and a proposed fifth hull, Number 797, proposed in the 1942 5th Supplementary Program, was never ordered.

Aircraft carriers
6 heavy and 6 light (plus 7 building )(1)
Hōshō built in 1922
Akagi (2) (ex-battlecruiser converted by 1927) — †1942
Kaga (ex-battleship converted in 1928) — †1942
Ryūjō completed 1933 — †1942
Sōryū — †1942
Hiryū — †1942
2 Zuihō class commissioned as aircraft carriers 1940-1941
 Shōhō - †1942
 Zuihō - †1944
2 Shōkaku class built 1941
Shōkaku — †1944 
Zuikaku — †1944
3 Taiyō class
Taiyō — †1944
Chūyō — †1943
Unyō — †1944
2 Hiyō class 
Hiyō — †1944 
Jun'yō
Shinano  (ex-battleship converted in 1942–44) — †1944

(1) Does not include Imperial Japanese Army built aircraft transports.
(2) Amagi — sister ship to Akagi both as a battlecruiser and as a conversion to an aircraft carrier, was destroyed during construction by an earthquake and replaced with the Kaga.

Heavy cruisers
18 (plus 1 building) (1)
2 Furutaka built 1926-1927
2 Aoba built 1926-1927
4 Myōkō built 1928-1929
4 Takao built 1932
4 Mogami built 1935-1937(2)
2 Tone built 1941
(1) Ibuki ordered but not laid down
(2) Mogamis designated light cruisers but were built to be up-gunned as heavies once the London Naval Treaty was broken.

Light cruisers
20 (plus 5 building) (1)  
2 Tenryū built 1919
5 Kuma built 1920-1921
1 Yubari built 1923
3 Sendai built 1924-1925
6 Nagara built 1922-1925
3 Katori (1 cancelled) built 1938-1940
(1) 4 Agano and 2 Ōyodo (1 cancelled).

Destroyers

115 (plus 43 building) (1)
3 Momi-class destroyer (3) built 1920-1922
13 Minekaze-class destroyer built 1920-1922
6 Wakatake-class destroyer built 1922-1923
9 Kamikaze-class destroyer built 1922-1924
12 Mutsuki-class destroyer built 1925-1927
19 Fubuki-class destroyer built 1926-1933 (included Ayanami subclass)
4 Akatsuki-class destroyer built 1932-1933 (subclass of Fubuki class)
6 Hatsuharu-class destroyer built 1933-1935
10 Shiratsuyu-class destroyer built 1936-1937
10 Asashio-class destroyer built 1937-1938
19 Kagerō-class destroyer built 1939
4 Yūgumo-class destroyer built 1941
(1) 27 Yūgumo class and 16 Akizuki-class building
(2) Others ships of the Momi-class were re-rated as patrol vessels. Also, note than Momi name was assigned in 1944 to a Matsu-class destroyer ship

Submarines
68 Fleet submarines
50 Ko-hyoteki-class midget submarines

Others
90 patrol ships, gunboats, armed merchant ships, and submarine chasers
6 minelayers
Itsukushima
42 minesweepers
55 auxiliaries

Merchant ships
Many under direct navy control as armed merchantmen.
1939 - 2,337 with 5,629,845 tons
World War II construction of 4,250,000 tons
2,346 sunk

Aircraft
Total 1750 first line with 370 trainers
660 Fighters
330 Carrier based strike aircraft
240 Land-based twin engine bombers
520 Seaplanes and flying boats.

Commanders
Imperial Japanese Navy commanders at the time of the Attack on Pearl Harbor:

See also
 List of Japanese Navy ships and war vessels in World War II

Notes

Imperial Japanese Navy
World War II naval ships of Japan
1941 in Japan
World War II orders of battle